Joseph Underwood may refer to:

 Joseph R. Underwood (1791–1876), lawyer, judge, U.S. Representative and Senator from Kentucky
 Joseph Underwood (merchant) (1779–1833), Australian merchant
 Joseph Edwin Underwood (1882–1960), civil engineer, land surveyor and political figure in Saskatchewan, Canada
 Joseph W. Underwood (born 1953), American teacher and football official
 Joseph F. Underwood, American politician, member of the Maine House of Representatives since 2020